Karapchiv may refer to one of two villages in Chernivtsi Oblast, Ukraine:

Karapchiv, Chernivtsi Raion, Chernivtsi Oblast
Karapchiv, Vyzhnytsia Raion, Chernivtsi Oblast